is a passenger railway station in located in the city of  Tsu, Mie Prefecture, Japan, operated by Central Japan Railway Company (JR Tōkai).

Lines
Ichishi Station is served by the Meishō Line, and is 13.0 rail kilometers from the terminus of the line at Matsusaka Station.

Station layout
The station consists of a single side platform serving one bi-directional track. The station is unattended.

Platforms

Adjacent stations

History 
On October 1, 1968, the station was rebuilt 300 meters closer to Matsusaka Station, and renamed to its present name. Freight operations were discontinued in February 1984. Along with its division and privatization of JNR on April 1, 1987, the station came under the control and operation of the Central Japan Railway Company.

Passenger statistics
In fiscal 2019, the station was used by an average of 109 passengers daily (boarding passengers only).

Surrounding area
Tsu City Hall Ichishi General Branch

See also
 List of railway stations in Japan

References

External links

JR Central home page

Railway stations in Japan opened in 1938
Railway stations in Mie Prefecture
Tsu, Mie